The Guardian Footballer of the Year is an annual award by the British newspaper The Guardian. Since 2016, it is awarded to a footballer regardless of gender "who has done something truly remarkable, whether by overcoming adversity, helping others or setting a sporting example by acting with exceptional honesty."

Winners

See also 
 The Guardian 100 Best Male Footballers in the World
 The 100 Best Female Footballers in the World

External links 
 Official website

References 

The Guardian awards
Association football-related lists
Association football trophies and awards